Neela Ramgopal (25 May 1935 – 1 March 2023) was an Indian Carnatic vocalist and Carnatic music teacher. Some of her works included Tamizh Inbam, Rama Upasana and Narayana Enniro. She was a recipient of awards, including the Sangeet Natak Akademi Award, the Sangita Kala Acharya Award by Madras Music Academy, and the Sangeetha Chudamani award from the Rama Seva Mandali.

Biography
Neela Ramgopal was born on 25 May 1935, in Kumbakonam in Tamil Nadu into a Brahmin Iyer family. Her father was a landlord. The family migrated back to their village in Tyagarajapuram where she went to school in Thiruvidaimarudur. It was only at the age of 23, she started studying Carnatic music seriously. She started studying Carnatic music with lessons from Sadagopalachari in Kumbakonam and later under N. M. Narayanan, T. K. Rangachary and M. L. Vasanthakumari.

Ramgopal taught students from 1965, the year her very first independent public concert came in. During this time she performed regularly as a radio artist with the All India Radio rising to be an "A Top" grade artist. She published a book of 50 Tamil compositions in Kannada script. In addition, she also recorded audio CDs of krithis in all the 72 Melakartha Ragas. Some of her recorded albums includedTamizh Inbam, Rama Upasana and Narayana Enniro.

Ramgopal was noted to have trained over 700 students over her career. She was also noted to be an early adopter of technology offering her training lessons online. She received the Sangeet Natak Akademi Award, the Sangita Kala Acharya award from the Madras Music Academy and the Sangeetha Chudamani award from the Rama Seva Mandali.

Personal life 
Ramgopal moved to Bangalore in Karnataka after her wedding at 19, initially living in Basavanagudi before moving to J. P. Nagar. She had two children. She was known to have been a polyglot with works in Tamil, Kannada, and English, and was referred to as Neela Maami by her students.

Ramgopal died on 1 March 2023 in Bangalore. She had been diagnosed with cancer earlier. She was aged 87.

Books

Awards and honors
Sangeet Natak Akademi Award 2016
Gurukripa Award 2017
Sangeetha Kala Acharya Award from the Madras Music Academy 2011
Kanchana Shree title 2018 by the Kanchana Shree Lakshminarayana Music Academy Trust
Best performer award from Sri Krishna Gana Sabha, Chennai
Best performer award from Madras Music Academy
Gana Prakeerthi award from the Nagarkoil Trust
Sangeetha Kala Samragni award from the Ramakrishna Gaanasabha
Sangeetha Chudamani award from Rama Seva Mandali
Karnataka Kalasri award from the Karnataka state government Sangeetha Nrithya Academy

Notes

References

External links 

 

1935 births
2023 deaths
Women Carnatic singers
Carnatic singers
Indian women classical singers
21st-century Indian singers
21st-century Indian women singers
Women musicians from Tamil Nadu
Singers from Tamil Nadu
Recipients of the Sangeet Natak Akademi Award
Deaths from cancer in India